Nowe Horniki  is a village in the administrative district of Gmina Nowa Karczma, within Kościerzyna County, Pomeranian Voivodeship, in northern Poland.

For additional historical details concerning this region, see History of Pomerania.

References

Nowe Horniki